QZ may refer to:

 Indonesia AirAsia (IATA airline code QZ)
 Quartz (IMA symbol Qz)
 Quartz (publication), a digital global business news publication (with the url qz.com)
 QZ decomposition or generalized Schur decomposition of a matrix, in linear algebra